The 1948 Loyola Lions football team was an American football team that represented Loyola University of Los Angeles (now known as Loyola Marymount University) as an independent during the 1948 college football season. In their second and final season under head coach Bill Sargent, the Lions compiled a 3–5–1 record and were outscored, 199 to 151.

Schedule

References

Loyola
Loyola Lions football seasons
Loyola Lions football